The exploration of the Antarctica includes:
Antarctic expeditions
Heroic Age of Antarctic Exploration
Farthest South
Research stations in Antarctica

 
History of Antarctica